Coyote Lake (also known as Coyote Reservoir) is an artificial lake in Santa Clara County, California, between Morgan Hill and Gilroy.

It holds 23,244 acre feet (28,671,009 m3) of water when full. It is the second largest reservoir owned by the Santa Clara Valley Water District.

A 4,595-acre county park ("Coyote-Bear") surrounds the reservoir, and provides camping (RVs and tents), fishing ("catch-and-release"), picnicking, and hiking activities. Swimming is not allowed by order of the Santa Clara Valley Water District.   Power boating, jetskiing, waterskiing, sailing, canoeing/kayaking and fishing are all allowed in the reservoir. The boat launch ramp is located two miles north of the visitor center. It has two docks, a 3-lane concrete ramp, paved parking and a restroom. For fisherman, the lake contains bluegill, black crappie, channel catfish, carp and black bass. The reservoir is closed to all boating between mid-October and mid-April.

The California Office of Environmental Health Hazard Assessment has issued a safe eating advisory for any fish caught in the Coyote lake due to elevated levels of mercury.

See also
Coyote Lake (disambiguation) for other lakes of the same name
List of lakes in California
List of lakes in the San Francisco Bay Area
List of reservoirs and dams in California

References

Reservoirs in Santa Clara County, California
Reservoirs in California
Reservoirs in Northern California
Bay Area Ridge Trail